Malaysia, a primarily Muslim country located in peninsular and insular regions of Southeast Asia, has a government heavily influenced by Islamic law, which expresses anti-heretical and anti-atheist views.  Notably, in 2017, the official Shahidan Kassim faced backlash for threatening to "hunt down" atheists in response to a meeting of members of Atheist Republic.

Demographics
Based on government data, the Malaysian website Malaysiakini estimates a community of no more than 300,000 irreligious people in a population of 30 million. As censuses only allow participants to name Islam, Buddhism, Christianity, Hinduism, and traditional Chinese religions as their faith, irreligious Malaysians end up with Sikhs (around 350,000) in the 2.1% who do not list any of the above. The remaining 300,000 could include atheists, animists, practitioners of folk religion, and other belief systems. However, it is possible that there are more in reality, and that these low numbers were caused by bias among census authorities or fear of repercussion toward participants.

Official status
Blasphemy is a crime in Malaysia, although technically, atheism is not. Apostasy is also not a federal crime, however, the nation's state-run courts do not typically allow Muslims to officially leave the religion, and they can receive counseling, fines, or jail time. Ethnic Malays are also legally required to identify as Muslim, and the law codes of Sharia are "developed and implemented at the state level", according to the United States Commission on International Religious Freedom. In 2016, Prime Minister Najib Razak, denounced atheism, secularism, liberalism, and humanism as threats to "Islam and the state". He also stated that "we will not tolerate any demands or right to apostasy by Muslims". In response to an August 2017 meeting in Kuala Lumpur of members of the Malaysian chapter of the Canadian organization Atheist Republic, government official Shahidan Kassim declared that atheists would be "hunted down", attributing their beliefs to a lack of religious education. The Malaysian government started a crackdown not long afterwards to find if Muslims had any role in the incident. This response was criticized by both the founder of Atheist Republic, Armin Navabi, as well as some Malaysian Muslims.

Muslim views
The fear of such things occurring to Malaysian atheists is compounded by incidents of similar violence in Bangladesh, where atheist bloggers have been killed by extremists. The Diplomat writer David Hutt claimed that he knew pro-democracy activists from Vietnam who were less hesitant to publicly criticize the Communist Party than atheist Malaysians to simply talk about religion in coffee shops.

While Malaysia is often considered a secular state, the views of its population do not always reflect this, and it may be growing more conservative. A PEW survey asking if Sharia should become the basis of national law saw 86% of Muslim respond in favor. This is a higher positive response rate than in some other Islamic-majority countries that are typically considered more conservative.

While a conservative nation, Malaysia's Muslim citizens do not necessarily reject scientific principles. Many view science as compatible with Islam, and 54% said that there was not any conflict between science and religion. Still, some objected to experiments involving non-halal substances, in vitro fertilization, and cloning.

References 

Religion in Malaysia
Malaysia